The Battle of Alhandic, also known as Zamora's trench Battle, was a battle that occurred on 5 August 939 in the city of Zamora, Spain. The battle occurred when the troops of Abd-ar-Rahman III assaulted the walls of Zamora. The defending troops were those loyal to Ramiro II, King of León. The fighting was so bloody that the tide of the battle did not turn until the ditch surrounding the city walls was entirely filled with corpses. The troops of Abderraman III won the day and were able to seize the city of Zamora.  This battle should not be confused with the Day of Zamora ( or ) which took place a few decades before in the year 901.

History 
Once Abd-ar-Rahman III came to power, he was quick to assert his power and made it his goal to finish the rebels in Al-Andalus.  He wanted to consolidate his power base and reestablish the internal order of the Emirate of Córdoba. He decided to go to the border and attack the cities that acted as a protective buffer against the Asturian / Leonese lands to the north.  It was on this defensive line that he came upon Zamora. The city was strategically important because it was squarely in the path of march typically used by the Leonese troops. Abderraman attacked the city on 5 August 939.  His strategy was to fill the pit, or moat around the city with bodies and debris so that his men could more easily climb the parapets and thus engage the defending soldiers directly.  This bloodthirsty strategy lends its name to the battle which is sometimes known as the Batalla del Foso de Zamora (Zamora's trench [moat] Battle).

The final result was a victory for the troops of Abderramán III who sacked the city of Zamora. However, the troops of Abderraman were defeated by Ramiro II of León in the Battle of Simancas in July the same year, 939.

See also 
 Day of Zamora – Celebrates the battle which took place outside the city walls in 901.
 Zamora, Spain
 Ramiro II of León
 Battle of Simancas

References 

Alhandic
10th century in the Kingdom of León
Alhandic
939
Alhandic
Alhandic
Alhandic
History of the province of Zamora